Let Him Go is a 2020 American neo-Western film starring Diane Lane and Kevin Costner, and directed, written, and co-produced by Thomas Bezucha, based on the 2013 novel of the same name by Larry Watson. The film follows a retired sheriff (Kevin Costner) and his wife (Diane Lane) who try to rescue their grandson from a dangerous family living off-the-grid. It also stars Lesley Manville, Kayli Carter, Will Brittain, and Jeffrey Donovan.

Let Him Go was theatrically released in the United States on November 6, 2020, by Focus Features. The film received positive reviews and grossed over $11.6 million.

Plot
In Montana, 1961, retired sheriff George Blackledge lives on a ranch with his wife Margaret, their son James, James's wife Lorna and infant son Jimmy. One afternoon, Margaret sees James's horse out on its own and senses something is wrong. When George goes out to the woods, he finds James's body by the creek; he had fallen off his horse and broken his neck.

In 1963, Lorna marries her new boyfriend, Donnie Weboy; it is obvious Lorna is not in love with Donnie but needs his support with Jimmy. One afternoon while out shopping, Margaret sees Lorna, Donnie and Jimmy getting ice cream. When Jimmy drops his, Donnie forcefully grabs Jimmy's arm and, when Lorna steps in, Donnie strikes her. Margaret later goes to their house to check in on Lorna, but a tenant tells her the three of them have left town. Margaret goes home and packs her bags with the intent of going to rescue Jimmy, and although George is reluctant, he joins her.

George and Margaret speak to a local sheriff who gives them a lead in Forsyth, Montana, a shop owner who is of relation to the Weboys who tells them to look in Gladstone, North Dakota. George is startled to discover that Margaret brought his gun with her, but she strongly feels she will need it. Outside of Gladstone, they come across a young Native American man named Peter Dragswolf. He provides them with some food and warmth for the evening, and tells them to look for Bill Weboy, who turns out to be Donnie's uncle.

The following morning, George and Margaret travel and meet Bill. Bill speaks to Donnie's mother, Blanche, who says she wants to meet the Blackledges. At her house, Blanche initially appears pleasant but later, when Lorna and Jimmy arrive, she starts to show her true colors, making rude comments toward the Blackledges and speaking sternly toward Lorna. The next day, George and Margaret visit Lorna at her job and take her to lunch. They plead with her to return home to Montana with Jimmy, but Lorna is worried what Donnie will do if she tries to leave. However, she is convinced to sneak out later while the Weboys are asleep.

Later that night, Blanche, Donnie and Bill, along with Blanche's two other sons Marvin and Elton, break into the Blackledges' motel room. Margaret tells Blanche that Donnie struck Lorna and Jimmy. Blanche asks Donnie if it is true, slapping him and then Margaret to ask how hard he hit Lorna. When she orders him to hit Margaret, George grabs his gun and points it at them. The men overpower him, and Blanche orders Donnie to chop off his fingers with a hatchet, which he does. When they leave, Margaret takes George to the hospital. A local officer visits them to tell them that he spoke to the Weboys, who made it seem like George attacked first since he and Margaret planned to abduct Jimmy. He tells the Blackledges that Jimmy is a Weboy now and suggests they leave town.

Defeated, George and Margaret make their way back to Montana, but when George is too weak to keep going, they stop by Peter's again to rest. Peter talks to Margaret and tells her about how men once stormed his village and took children away from their families and then tried to "wash the Indian" out of them. When he returned to his grandmother, they couldn’t understand each other anymore. Knowing she must stay close to family, Margaret asks George if they can move out there to be near Jimmy. George says he is done and wants to give up. Margaret breaks down, devastated that they have lost both James and Jimmy.

During the night, George sneaks out and goes back to the Weboy house. George finds a shotgun on the Weboy's back porch. He checks and replaces the shells in the gun. He sets a fire outside as a distraction and then makes his way into Donnie and Lorna's room, where he forces Donnie down at gunpoint while Lorna leaves. Meanwhile, Margaret notices George has gone and rushes with Peter to find him. George knocks Donnie unconscious when he tries to alert the others. Blanche wakes up as George fights Bill, and Lorna tumbles down the stairs. Blanche aims her pistol at George as he gets Jimmy back but she accidentally shoots Bill in the face, killing him. George then throws Jimmy over the balcony to Lorna, who catches him as Blanche shoots George in the chest.

George musters enough strength to fight her for the gun as Marvin and Elton run upstairs, only for George to cause Blanche to shoot both of them. Margaret and Peter find Lorna and Jimmy outside. Margaret rushes in to try and get George out. Blanche corners them and shoots George again, this time killing him. Margaret then grabs the shotgun and shoots Blanche dead. Peter gets her out as the Weboy house goes up in flames.

As the morning comes, Margaret parts ways with Peter and drives home with Lorna and Jimmy. She weeps for the loss of George, but looks over at Jimmy, knowing that he is finally safe.

Cast

Production

Casting
The film was announced in February 2019, with Thomas Bezucha directing his screenplay based on Larry Watson's novel, and Kevin Costner and Diane Lane attached to star. Bezucha would also produce the film with Paula Mazur and Mitchell Kaplan.

Filming
Filming began in April 2019 in Calgary, with Lesley Manville, Will Brittain, Jeffrey Donovan and Kayli Carter added to the cast. Booboo Stewart was added in May. Filming lasted through May 17.

Release

Theatrical
The film was released by Focus Features on November 6, 2020. It was previously scheduled to be released on August 21, 2020, but was delayed due to the COVID-19 pandemic. The studio spent an estimated $8 million promoting the film.

Home media
Let Him Go was released on digital download on January 19, 2021 and on Blu-ray and DVD by Universal Pictures Home Entertainment in the United States. It was then released on Blu-ray and DVD on April 26, 2021 by Warner Bros. Home Entertainment in the United Kingdom. It began streaming on HBO and HBO Max on July 3, 2021.

Reception

Box office 
Let Him Go grossed $9.4 million in the United States and Canada, and $2.6 million in other territories, for a worldwide total of $11.6 million.

The film made $1.5 million from 2,454 theaters on its first day, including $150,000 from Thursday night previews. It went on to debut to $4 million, becoming the second straight Focus Features film to top the box office after Come Play had the week prior. The audience was 66% over the age of 35, with 52% being female. The film made $1.8 million in its second weekend, finishing second behind newcomer Freaky, then $710,000 in its third.

In its fourth weekend of release the film made $453,000 from 1,447 theaters (and $670,000 over the five-day Thanksgiving frame). The film became available via VOD on the same weekend, and was the top-rented film on FandangoNow and Apple TV, and sixth on Google Play. The following weekend the film made $208,610, and finished first on Spectrum, second on FandangoNow, and ninth on Google Play.

Critical response 
The site's critics consensus reads: "Let Him Gos uneven blend of adult drama and revenge thriller is smoothed over by strong work from a solid veteran cast." On Metacritic, the film has a weighted average score of 63 out of 100 based on 36 critics, indicating "generally favorable reviews". Audiences polled by CinemaScore gave the film an average grade of "B−" on an A+ to F scale, while PostTrak reported 82% of audience members gave the film a positive score, with 50% saying they would definitely recommend it.

Owen Gleiberman of Variety praised Costner and Lane's performances, saying they "give it their all in a genre film that fuses suspense with honest emotion." Writing for The Globe and Mail, Barry Hertz gave the film 3 out of 4 stars, saying: "A skilfully executed thriller that is narrowly aimed at one demographic – audiences over 50 who like a little violence with their late-life dramas – but succeeds at entertaining just about anyone who comes across its dusty, blood-soaked path."

References

External links
 
 

2020 films
2020 thriller drama films
2020 Western (genre) films
2020s drama road movies
2020s English-language films
American drama road movies
American thriller drama films
American Western (genre) films
Films about families
Films about marriage
Films based on American novels
Films based on Western (genre) novels
Films directed by Thomas Bezucha
Films postponed due to the COVID-19 pandemic
Films scored by Michael Giacchino
Films set in 1961
Films set in 1963
Films set in Montana
Films set in North Dakota
Films shot in Calgary
Films with screenplays by Thomas Bezucha
Focus Features films
Neo-Western films
Universal Pictures films
2020s American films